John Philip Shenale  (often mentioned as Phil Shenale) is a Canadian composer, arranger, musician and producer based in Los Angeles.

Background
Shenale was born in Canada in 1951. His family relocated to the United States in the late-1950s. His earliest memories of music consist of hearing his father, an avid lover of classical music, play the violin, cello and mandolin in their home during his childhood. After attending a Latin High Mass at the age of five, he recalls being drawn to the piano in an attempt to recreate the music he had heard during the ceremony. The experience awakened his passion for the art and he soon found himself improvising his own music. It wasn't until the age of twelve, however, that he began formal piano lessons.

Shenale began serious composition while in high school, drawing inspiration from classical composers such as Ravel, Granados, Britten and Stravinsky.  He soon discovered modern-day musicians such as The Yardbirds, Jimi Hendrix and The Beatles which ignited his passion for rock and roll, leading him to form his first band.  During his undergraduate studies, he first majored in physics and then music before dropping out in favor of playing and travelling with a hard rock club band.

Career
Shenale has a very deliberate production style, carefully creating a very natural-sounding theatrical background using both cutting-edge and very old tools. He has contributed his talents as a composer, arranger, musician and/or producer to over forty Gold and Platinum albums, both domestic and international and over thirty Top-40 singles. His work has been associated with 21 Grammy nominations.

Early work
Shenale's early work began in film, a medium he would subsequently revisit throughout his career, with 1971's The Young Graduates. Continuing throughout the 1970s he recorded and performed live with artists such as Gregory Hines, Redbone, Jon Lucien, Bobby Womack and Severance. However, he considers his collaborations, specifically during the latter part of the decade, with artists such as Jim Keltner and The Beach Boys to be of particular value and significance, affording him a considerable amount of time in-studio where he was given the opportunity to work with state-of-the-art equipment and to learn the language and various philosophies behind recording professionally.

Shenale's instruments of choice during this time included the piano, Hammond, Fender Rhodes, Clavinet, Orchestron, Mellotron along with various other synthesizers.

In popular music
Shenale's work has been featured on albums by artists such as Tori Amos, Willy DeVille, Jane's Addiction, Tracy Chapman, Billy Idol, Janet Jackson, Diana Ross, The Bangles, Dionne Warwick, Rick Springfield, Buddy Guy, Robert Cray and John Hiatt.

1980-1989
In 1980 he worked with Franco Battiato for the opening song "Up Patriots To Arms" of his album Patriots (Keyboards). The song was also included at the album Echoes of Sufi Dancers (1985, keyboards).

Shenale worked with Rick Springfield on his Living in Oz album (1983, keyboards, string arrangements), on Hard to Hold (1984, keyboards), on Tao (1985, Keyboards, Synthesizer, DX-7) and on Karma (1999, violin, organ/Hammond, Synthesizer voices).

In 1984 he teamed up with Janet Jackson for her Dream Street album (1984, Composer, arranger, keyboards).

Shenale worked with Belinda Carlisle on her albums Belinda (1986, Keyboards, synthesizer) and Her greatest hits (1992, Keyboards, synthesizer). He collaborated with Bonnie Tyler for her Secret Dreams and Forbidden Fire album (1986, synthesizer).

He wrote the song "I Want To Be Needed" for Shari Belafonte and Chris Norman which featured on the albums Eyes of Night (1987), Hits from the Heart (1988) and Heartbreaking Hits (2004).

His collaboration with The Bangles started with the Everything album / "Eternal flame", song (1988, Keyboards, Producer, Programming) and went on with The Essential Bangles album (2004, keyboards, programming) and the We Are the '80s album (2006, keyboards, programming).

He worked with Olivia Newton-John on The Rumour album (1988, Keyboards, programming) and Dreams So Real on the Rough Night in Jericho album (1988, Keyboards).

In 1989 he worked with Natalie Cole on her album Good to be Back (1989, synthesizer, programming), with Jimmy Hamen on Can't Fight the Midnight album (1989, keyboards) and with Jeff Silverman and Kevin Raleigh on Delusions of Grandeur album (1989, Keyboards).

1990-1999
Shenale collaborated with Jane's Addiction (a Los Angeles quartet which were one of the most influential and iconic alternative rock bands of the late 1980s and the early 1990s) for their album Ritual de lo Habitual (1990, strings). He has been a member of the Royal Macadamians band along with Davitt Sigerson, John Beverly Jones and Bob Thiele Jr. releasing the Experiments in Terror album (1990) creating an arty and idiosyncratic mixture of jazz-and-funk-infected tunes given a surrealistic spin. He worked as an engineer for Robert Cray's Midnight Stroll album (1990, engineer) and he played the bass for Billy Idol's Charmed Life album (1990, bass).

He has worked with Jimmy Barnes on his albums Soul Deep (1991, keyboards, horn arrangements, string arrangements), Heat (1993, keyboards), Flesh and Wood (1994, Piano, string arrangements), Hits (1996, Horn, Keyboards, string arrangements) and JB50 (2006, piano, keyboards, horn arrangements, string arrangements).

Shenale collaborated with Toni Childs for her albums House of Hope (1991, keyboards, programming) and Ultimate Collection (2000, keyboards, programming).

He has been one of Tori Amos's close musical mentors, musician who detuned an old upright piano (prepared piano) for "Bells for her" and a long-time arranger engineer of the sessions and collaborator for her studio albums. Their collaboration started with Little Earthquakes (1992, programming). His experimental approach to arrangements painted a dinstictive sonic landscape which was notable since Under the Pink (1994). Their collaboration which transcends the unexpected use of music instruments creating a unique sound signature, has flourished with the use of string quartets and full orchestras. throughout numerous albums such as Little Earthquakes (1992, programming, keyboard programming, musician), "Winter" (1992, mellotron), "Cornflake Girl" (1994, strong arrangements, woodwind arrangement), Under the Pink (1994, strings, organ/hammond, string arrangements), Boys for Pele (1996, arranger), and From the Choirgirl Hotel (1998, string arrangements).

He worked with Willy DeVille as his producer on 4 studio albums Backstreets of Desire (1992), Loup Garou (1995), Crow Jane Alley (2004), and Pistola (2008)., Introducing Willy DeVille (2009, wurlitzer). Shenale did great work with DeVille out of his North Hollywood compound, with albums that maintained DeVille's career in Europe in a major way, as he had, in all practicality, given up on his American career.

Shenale worked with Santana for their albums Milagro (1992, string programming) and Milagro/Sacred Fire (2002, string programming).

In 1993 he collaborated with Buddy Guy for the Feels Like Rain album (1993, organ, synthesizer). He worked with Diesel for the albums: Hepfidelity (1993, keyboards, pecussion, string arrangements, assistant engineer, assistant, keyboard arrangements, percussion arrangement, overdub assistant) and Johnny Diesel & Injectors/Hepfidelity (2005, keyboards, percussion, string arrangements, assistant).

He has collaborated with Katey Sagal for her albums Well... (1994, keyboards, orchestrations). He contributed to the album Tribute to Edith Piaf [Amherst] (1994, drums).

Shenale worked with Tracey Chapman on her albums New Beginning (1995, keyboards), "Give Me One Reason" (1996, keyboards) and Collection (2001, keyboards) and with Air Supply for their records News from Nowhere (1995, arranger, strings), The Book of Love (1997, strings, keyboards) and Across the Concrete Sky (2003, string arrangements).

He has collaborated with Gus for his albums Gus (1996, mellotron, string arrangements) and Word of Mouth Parade (1999, mixing, keyboards), Celestial Winds for the album Bliss (1996, Keyboards, bass) and with Rust for the album Bar Chord Ritual (1996, sounds).

He worked with Uma on her album Fare Well (1997, percussion, programming) and Five for Fighting on his album Message for Albert (1997, arranger, string arrangements).

He worked with Bette Midler on her Bathhouse Betty album (1998, arranger, piano, keyboards), Eric Martin on his Somewhere in the Middle album (1998, Chamberlin, organ/Hammond), MC Solaar on his album Le Tour de la Question (1998, assistant), Adam Cohen on his Adam Cohen album (1998, ARP synthesizer, organ/Hammond, string arrangements) and John Hiatt on his album The Best of John Hiatt [Capitol] (1998, loop).

Shenale worked with Curtis Stigers on his album To Be Loved (1999, string arrangements) and with Smokie on the album The Best of 20 Years (1999, composer).

2000-2009
He collaborated with The Beach Boys for their albums Keepin' the Summer Alive/The Beach Boys '85 (2000, oberheim synthesizer) and M.I.U. Album/L.A. (Light Album) (2000, oberheim synthesizer) and Katey Sagal on her album Room (2004, organ, keyboards, sampling, string arrangements).

Shenale collaborated with Tori Amos on the albums Strange Little Girls (2001, arranger, strings, synthesizer), Scarlet's Walk (2002, flute, string arrangements), Tales of a Librarian: A Tori Amos Collection (2003, audio production, main personnel, strings, piano, piano (electric), Wurlitzer piano, chord organ, Wurlitzer, chamberlin, synthesizer, ARP synthesizer, percussion, loops, sampling, organ/Hammond, assistant, marxophone, string ensemble), A Piano: The Collection (2006, flute, programming, string arrangements), American Doll Posse (2007, string arrangements, brass arrangement, string conductor, brass conductor), Abnormally Attracted to Sin (2009, arranger, conductor, synthesizer, organ/Hammond, orchestration, string arrangements, Hammond B3), Midwinter Graces (2009, conductor, synthesizer, sampling, string arrangements, brass arrangement).

He worked with Jann Arden on the albums Blood Red Cherry (2000, keyboards, drum loop) and Greatest Hurts: The Best of Jann Arden (2001, keyboards, drum loop) and with Chris Spedding on his album One Step Ahead of The Blues (2002, drums).

He collaborated with Wendy Maharry on her album Released (2003, producer, arranger, engineer, strings).

Shenale worked with David Young on his albums Beyond... Celestial Winds (2004, engineer, piano organ, keyboards, bass) and Woodstock: The Mystery of Destiny (2007, engineer, keyboards).

He collaborated with Eileen Carey for her album Hearts of Time (2006, composer) and with Evelio for the album Evelio (2006, producer, composer, mixing, Fender Rhodes, Wurlitzer, champerlin, keyboards, horn arrangements, string arrangements, loop).

He worked with Sylvie Vartan on her album Nouvelle Vague (2007, producer, engineer, arranger, guitar, flute, piano, Fender Rhodes, farfisa organ, Wurlitzer, chamberlin organ/Hammond, clavier, clavecin, realization) and William MacGregor on his album Welcome to Carnival and Marc Lavoine for his album Best of Solo (2007, synthesizer).

2010-2019
Shenale was Tori Amos' orchestral collaborator for the Night of Hunters album released by the classical label Deutsche Grammophon. The album marked their twentieth anniversary of their long-time collaboration which began with her solo debut, Little Earthquakes (1992). Shenale's string arrangements are the most noticeable sonic advancement since he brought the use of real strings in Tori Amos' music. Shenale teamed up with Tori Amos for the albums Night of Hunters (2011, string arrangements, woodwind arrangement), Gold Dust (2012, orchestral arrangements, reworking), "Flavor" (2012, arranger, orchestration), The Light Princess, Original cast recording (2015, orchestration), Native Invander (2017, keyboards, synthesizer, programming).

He has worked with Addie Brik on her album Brik & Shenale (2012, composer).

He worked with Katey Sagal on her album Covered (2013, organ, piano, string arrangements, synthesizer horn). As a member of The Forrest Rangers band they have worked together releasing songs from the soundtracks of Sons of Anarchy and Mayans M.C. as studio albums, EPs and singles.

He workd with Zwerg on his album Dual Citizen (2014, producer, arranger, keyboards, bass) and Katya for her album Rock Lives, Deluxe Edition (2015, composer). 

He teamed up with A Bad Think / Michael Marquart for his albums The Tragic End of a Dreamer (2016, keyboards) and Savior (2019, keyboards).,

John Philip Shenale was the arranger in Michel Polnareff's Olympia 2016 album (2016, arranger) and he worked with Elouise on her album Deep Water (2016, composer, instrumentation, string arrangements).

He collaborated with Marta Woodhull for her album Face (2017, producer, composer, brass, chamberlin, clavinet, drum loop, drum mix, engineer, guitar, guitar (synthesizer), guitar loops, Hammond B3, Harpsichord, keyboards, mellotron, mixing, organ/Hammond, soloist, synthesizer, vocals/background, Wurlitzer piano).

Shenale worked with Kris Kelly on his album Runaways (2019, string arrangements, brass arrangement, woodwind arrangements, keyboards) and with Ralph Molina on his album Love and Inspiration (2019, arranger, keyboards, mixer).

2020-present
Shenale worked with Tori Amos on her album Ocean to Ocean (2021, keyboards, organ/Hammond, recording) and with Michael Marquart / A Bad Think on his albums Lifelike (2021, keyboards) and X (2022, keyboards).

Career in film, TV, theater, and other works
Shenale's work has also been featured on films and musicals by directors such as Curtis Hanson, John Hughes, Carl Reiner, Herbert Ross, Walter Hill, Richard Lester, Brian Yuzna, Steve Miner, Paul Verhoeven, Frank Oz, Marianne Elliott.

His work includes: Alvin & the Chipmunks (1983, writer),  Janet Jackson: Dream Street (music video 1984, composer), Footloose [Original Motion Picture Soundtrack] / "Holding out for a Hero", song (1984, synthesizer, programming),The Dirt Bike Kid (1985, composer), Little Shop of Horrors (1986, musician), Steele Justice (1987, score), Licence to Drive (1988, writer),  Emperor of the Bronx (Teenage Mutant Ninja Turtles: Coming out of Their Shells (1989, keyboards, programming), Emperor of the Bronx (1990, producer, composer),  Return of the Living Dead III (1993, composer, orchestrator), The Waiting Game (1999, Royal Macadamians), Smart House (1999, performer), Out of Line (2001, composer), The Diamond of Jeru (2001, composer), Star Academy 5, Star Academy 5: Les Meilleurs Moments (2005, sampling, clavier, rhythm, string arrangements), Son of a Wanted Man by Louis L' Amour, dramatized (2005, composer) and The Big Crying (2021, arranger).

John Philip Shenale is a band member of The Forest Rangers mostly known as the house band of FX action crime drama television series Sons of Anarchy (2008-2014) along with the musicians Bob Thiele Jr., Greg Leisz (pedal steel guitar), Matt Chamberlain (drums), Gia Ciambotti (background vocals). Bob Thiele Jr. was nominated three times for an Emmy award for the songs he wrote for Sons of Anarchy and were performed by The Forest Rangers (This Life/2009, Day is Gone/2014, Come Join The Murder/2015). Their work was released as four soundtrack albums (Songs of Anarchy: Music from Sons of Anarchy Seasons 1-4 (2011), Sons of Anarchy: Songs of Anarchy Vol. 2 (2012), Sons of Anarchy: Songs of Anarchy Vol. 3 (2013), Sons of Anarchy: Songs of Anarchy Vol. 4) (2015), 3 EPs (Sons of Anarchy: North County, Sons of Anarchy: Shelter, Sons of Anarchy: The King is Gone), numerous singles and a debut album called Land Ho!. (The Forest Rangers launched a PledgeMusic campaign to record and release it and Bob Thiele Jr. called it "a passion project".)   In 2018 The Forest Rangers contributed to the Mayans M.C. soundtrack with the song "Black is Black". The Forest Rangers occasionally used the name The Reluctant Apostles for their live performances with Katey Sagal as their lead singer. 

Shenale appeared in Samantha Hale's documentary series Map the Music (2011) and talked about creating emotion through sound. and in Lifelike:The Making of an Album in Dolby Atmos (2021, official documentary by Derrick Borte focusing on behind-the-scenes with musicians as they bring A Bad Think's album Lifelike to life).

He was the orchestrator of The Light Princess, a musical with music and lyrics by Tori Amos which premiered at the Royal National Theatre in London in 2013.

Music credits
John Philip Shenale's music credits include those of producer, composer, arranger, conductor, orchestration and string arrangements.

References

External links
 
 
 
 

 </noinclude>

Living people
Place of birth missing (living people)
Year of birth missing (living people)
Sons of Anarchy
Canadian male composers
Canadian record producers
Canadian keyboardists